Robert De Waele (17 May 1933 – 15 May 1995) was a Belgian sprint canoer who competed in the early 1960s. At the 1960 Summer Olympics in Rome, he was eliminated in the semifinals of the K-1 1000 m event and the repechages of the K-1 4 × 500 m event.

References
Robert De Waele's profile at Sports Reference.com
Robert De Waele's obituary 

1933 births
1995 deaths
Belgian male canoeists
Canoeists at the 1960 Summer Olympics
Olympic canoeists of Belgium